Porto de Sanabria (Leonese: Porto de Senabria), also known as Porto, is a municipality located in the province of Zamora, Castile and León, Spain. According to the 2012 census (INE), the municipality has a population of 216 inhabitants.

Geography
Porto is located near the borders of Castile and León with Galicia, in the Sanabria Lake Natural Park, nearby the Galician Massif. It is 90 km far from Bragança, in Portugal, 113 from Ponferrada, and 171 from Zamora. Its municipal territory counts several lakes, reservoirs and rivers.

Culture
Porto is one of the few bilingual places of its province, in which is commonly spoken both Spanish and Galician.

See also
List of municipalities in Zamora

References

External links

Municipalities of the Province of Zamora